Stick Around for Joy is the third and final studio album by Icelandic alternative rock band the Sugarcubes. It was released in 1992 by Elektra. The album was supported by four singles: "Hit", which reached number one on the Modern Rock Tracks chart in the US and number 17 on the UK Singles Chart, "Walkabout", "Vitamin" and "Leash Called Love", which went to number one on the US Dance chart.

The album peaked at number 95 on the Billboard 200 and reached number 16 on the UK Albums Chart, marking the band's lowest charting positions on both charts.

Production
The band recorded the album in the United States, with producer Paul Fox.

Critical reception
Trouser Press wrote that "Björk’s singing is shapely, passionate and willfully bizarre; she carries the album pretty much on her own." MusicHound Rock: The Essential Album Guide deemed Stick Around for Joy the band's "most accessible and, true to its name, happiest sounding album, packed end to end with lively and tuneful dance pop." The Rolling Stone Album Guide thought that "it's the churning interplay of guitarist Thor Eldon and the rhythm section that ultimately carries the album." The Orlando Sentinel wrote that "bassist Bragi Olafsson and drummer Siggi Baldursson don't do much to dispel the notion that funk just isn't a Nordic thing." The Spin Alternative Record Guide wrote that by Stick Around for Joy the Sugarcubes had "already degenerated into mind-numbing mediocrity."

Music videos
"Hit", directed by Óskar Jónasson. Another version was directed by Pedro Romhanyi
"Walkabout", directed by Óskar Jónasson
"Vitamin"

Track listing

Personnel
The Sugarcubes
The Sugarcubes – mixing, lyrics and music
Björk Guðmundsdóttir – vocals
Einar Örn Benediktsson – vocals, trumpet
Þór Eldon Jónsson – guitar
Margrét Örnólfsdóttir – keyboards
Bragi Ólafsson – bass
Sigtryggur Baldursson – Drums and percussion

Additional personnel
John McGeoch – guitar (track 1)
Paul Fox – producer, mixing
Ed Thacker – engineer, mixing
Chris Laidlow – assistant engineer
Stephen Marcussen – mastering
Me Company – cover design

Charts

References

The Sugarcubes albums
1992 albums
Albums produced by Paul Fox (record producer)
Elektra Records albums